Novovoznesenka is a rural locality (a selo) in Klyuchevsky Selsoviet, Klyuchevsky District, Altai Krai, Russia. The population was 168 as of 2013. There are 5 streets.

Geography 
Novovoznesenka is located 8 km southeast of Klyuchi (the district's administrative centre) by road. Klyuchi is the nearest rural locality.

References 

Rural localities in Klyuchevsky District